In association football, season 2008–09 was Airdrie United's seventh competitive season. They competed in the First Division, Challenge Cup, League Cup, and the Scottish Cup.

Summary
Airdrie United finished ninth in the First Division, entering the play-offs losing 3–2 to Ayr United on aggregate. Despite losing in the playoff, they regained their first division status due to Livingston's forced relegation due to going into administration. They reached the fifth round of the Scottish Cup, the third round of the League Cup, and clinched the Challenge Cup beating Ross County in the final.

League table

Results and fixtures

First Division

First Division play-offs

Challenge Cup

League Cup

Scottish Cup

Player statistics

Squad

|}

a.  Includes other competitive competitions, including playoffs and the Scottish Challenge Cup.

References

Airdrieonians F.C. seasons
Airdrie United